
Gmina Dąbie is a rural gmina (administrative district) in Krosno Odrzańskie County, Lubusz Voivodeship, in western Poland.

Villages
Gmina Dąbie contains the villages and settlements of Brzeźnica, Budynia, Ciemnice, Dąbie, Dąbki, Godziejów, Gola, Gronów, Kosierz, Łagów, Lubiatów, Mokry Młyn, Nowy Zagór, Pław, Połupin, Stary Zagór, Suchy Młyn, Szczawno and Trzebule.

Neighbouring gminas
Gmina Dąbie is bordered by the gminas of Bobrowice, Czerwieńsk, Krosno Odrzańskie, Nowogród Bobrzański and Świdnica.

Twin towns – sister cities

Gmina Dąbie is twinned with:
 Lieberose/Oberspreewald, Germany

References

Dabie
Krosno Odrzańskie County